Avalanche is the fourth studio album by American hard rock band Mountain, released in July 1974. It featured the return of drummer Corky Laing and was the band's only recording with second guitarist David Perry. It was their final album of the 1970s and the last to feature bassist/producer Felix Pappalardi.

Track listing 
 "Whole Lotta Shakin' Goin' On" (Dave Williams,  Myriam S. Davidson) – 5:05
 "Sister Justice" (Felix Pappalardi, Gail Collins, Wyatt Day) – 3:58
 "Alisan" (Leslie West) – 4:41
 "Swamp Boy" (Pappalardi, Collins) – 2:54
 "(I Can't Get No) Satisfaction" (Mick Jagger, Keith Richards) – 5:14
 "Thumbsucker" (Pappalardi, Collins) – 3:20
 "You Better Believe It" (West, Corky Laing) – 5:47
 "I Love to See You Fly" (West, Pappalardi, Collins) – 3:46
 "Back Where I Belong" (West, Laing) – 2:56
 "Last of the Sunshine Days" (Pappalardi, Collins) – 3:47

Personnel 
 Leslie West – guitar, vocals
 Felix Pappalardi – bass, vocals, keyboards, production
 David Perry – rhythm guitar
 Corky Laing – drums, percussion

Additional personnel
 Bud Prager – executive producer
 Bob d'Orleans – recording engineer
 George Lopez – recording engineer
 Gail Collins – artwork, photography
 Brad Joblin – photography

Charts

References

External links 
 Mountain - Avalanche (1974) album review by James Chrispell, credits & releases at AllMusic.com
 Mountain - Avalanche (1974) album releases & credits at Discogs.com

Mountain (band) albums
1974 albums
Windfall Records albums
Albums produced by Felix Pappalardi